Doctor's sausage is a popular variety of emulsified boiled sausage in Russia and the former Soviet republics, corresponding to GOST standard 23670-79, similar to bologna or mortadella but much lower in fat. It is considered a diet product, with pale pink color and low fat content.

In accordance with the legislation of the Eurasian Economic Union, no meat products may be released using names that are similar to the names of meat products established by interstate (regional) standards, with the exception of meat products manufactured according to these standards. In the technical regulations, as an example of such a name, "Doctor's sausage" (along with some others) is given.

History
This sausage was first produced in 1936, after the All-Russian Research Institute of the Meat Industry developed a recipe for sausage and the technology for its production. Its first production run was carried out at the Moscow Meat Processing Plant named after Anastas Mikoyan. The sausage was intended to be a dietary supplement for people exhibiting signs of prolonged starvation (specifically "patients with compromised health as a result of the Civil War"), hence its name. Because it was a mild-tasting, inexpensive and relatively healthy source of meat, Doctor's Sausage became very popular in the USSR.

The recipe
The exact recipe for Doctor's Sausage, which was used as an industry standard from 1936 to 1974:

 25 kg beef
 70 kg semi-fat pork
 3 liters milk
 2 liters eggs
 2 kg salt 
 200 grams sugar
 30 grams cardamom
 50 g ascorbic acid (color stabilizer)<ref
name=understandrussia>"Kolbasa – The Food Symbol of The USSR." Understanding Russia,  2014. Retrieved 20 February 2023.</ref>

Later changes
Starting in 1974, due to food shortages and other economic downturns in the Soviet Union, the industry standard for Doctor's Sausage was altered to include fillers and other low-cost ingredients to stretch the meat. The alteration of the Doctor's Sausage recipe is sometimes cited as one of the events presaging the eventual downfall of the Soviet Union.

References

 Sausages
 Russian cuisine
Soviet cuisine
Health in the Soviet Union